This is a list of seasons completed by the Kansas City Command. The Command were a professional arena football franchise of the Arena Football League (AFL), based in Kansas City, Missouri. The team was established in 2006 as the Kansas City Brigade, and played their home games at Sprint Center. As the Brigade, the franchise took some players in their inaugural season from the New Orleans VooDoo due to the effects Hurricane Katrina had on New Orleans, including the home of the VooDoo, New Orleans Arena. The Brigade filled the empty spot in the VooDoo's division for that season. The franchise made the playoffs only once out of their five seasons, losing their only playoff game. Prior to the 2009 season, the AFL announced that it had suspended operations indefinitely and canceled the 2009 season. On June 19, 2010 it was announced that the team would return to play for the 2011 season. On October 11, 2010 the team's name was changed to the Kansas City Command. On August 23, 2012 it was announced that the franchise would no longer operate.

References
General
 

Specific

Arena Football League seasons by team
Kansas City Command seasons
Missouri sports-related lists